Al-Hafar (also spelled al-Hafr) is a village in central Syria, administratively part of the Homs Governorate, south of Homs. It is situated in the Syrian Desert, located south of Sadad, west of Huwwarin and northeast of Qarah. According to the Central Bureau of Statistics (CBS), al-Hafar had a population of 589 in the 2004 census. Its inhabitants are predominantly Syriac Orthodox Christians.

References

Populated places in Homs District
Villages in Syria
Syriac Orthodox Christian communities in Syria